The 1989 Wake Forest Demon Deacons football team was an American football team that represented Wake Forest University during the 1989 college football season. In their third season under head coach Bill Dooley, the Demon Deacons compiled a 2–8–1 record and finished in seventh place in the Atlantic Coast Conference.

Schedule

Team leaders

References

Wake Forest
Wake Forest Demon Deacons football seasons
Wake Forest Demon Deacons football